Comin' Through is an album by the American jazz trumpeter Eddie Henderson recorded in 1977 and released on the Capitol label. The album rose to No. 6 on the Blues & Soul Top British Soul Albums chart.

Overview
Artists such as Patrice Rushen, Lee Ritenour, Dianne Reeves, Philip Bailey and James Mtume appeared on the album.

Critical reception
The Allmusic review by Richard S. Ginell says, "In 1977, Eddie Henderson slipped into the clutches of Capitol Records, which didn't have much of a jazz division and predictably didn't know how to showcase its adventurous new trumpeter. First and foremost, they thought they could turn him into a pop/disco star -- and so, that idiot beat turns up on most of the tracks here...  the deadliest element here is the mostly mediocre material that Henderson has to work with, and thus, his occasionally lost-sounding horn is largely spent on lost causes.

Track listing
All compositions by Eddie Henderson except as indicated
 "Say You Will" (James Mtume) - 4:29
 "Open Eyes" (Patrice Rushen) - 3:52
 "Morning Song" (George Cables) - 5:36
 "Movin' On" - 5:56
 "Source" (Mtume) - 4:34
 "The Funk Surgeon" (Rushen) - 4:57
 "Beyond Forever" (Cables) - 4:37
 "Connie" - 3:12

Personnel
Eddie Henderson - trumpet, flugelhorn
Julian Priester - trombone 
Mani Boyd, Connie Henderson - reeds and flutes
George Cables, Charles Mimms, Mtume, Patrice Rushen - keyboards
Al McKay, Lee Ritenour - guitars
Paul Jackson, Patrice Rushen - basses
Howard "Locksmith" King - drums
Philip Bailey, Mtume - congas
Skip Drinkwater, Mtume, Patrice Rushen - percussion
Philip Bailey, Howard King, Mtume, Dianne Reeves, Patrice Rushen - vocals

References 

1977 albums
Capitol Records albums
Eddie Henderson (musician) albums
Albums recorded at Wally Heider Studios